Walter Perrie (born 1949) is a Scottish poet, author, editor and critic. He has also published under the pseudonym Patrick MacCrimmon.

Education 
Born in the village of Quarter, South Lanarkshire, Scotland, on 5 June 1949, Walter Perrie was educated at the Hamilton Academy, and studied philosophy at the University of Edinburgh. (He subsequently gained a further degree from the University of Stirling.)

Career 
Since the 1970s, Walter Perrie has been a poet, editor, travel writer and contributor to numerous magazines and periodicals. Perrie was a founding co-editor in 1969 of the literary magazine Chapman (Chapman Publishing, Edinburgh), editing the magazine until 1975. Managing Editor, 1985–90, of Margin:International Arts Quarterly, Perrie has also been editor of Lines Review and, with John Herdman, Fras magazine. Scottish-Canadian Exchange Fellow at the University of British Columbia, Canada, 1984–85, Perrie is also a former Writer in Residence, University of Stirling (1991.)

Works 
Perrie's published works include:
 (as Patrick MacCrimmon) Deidre, 1971
 Ulysses, 1971
 (ed. with Hugh MacDiarmid) Metaphysics and Poetry, 1975
 Surge aquilo, 1975
 Poem on a Winter Night, 1976
 A Lamentation for the Children, 1977
 By Moon and Sun, 1980
 Out of Conflict, 1982
 Concerning the Dragon, 1984
 Roads that Move: A Journey Through Eastern Europe, 1991
 Thirteen Lucky Poems, 1991
 From Milady's Wood and Other Poems, (Scottish Contemporary Poets series: Scottish Cultural Press, 1977)
 The Light in Strathearn (poems), 2000
 Decagon: Selected Poems 1995-2005
 The Corbie an the Tod (Fras Publications: Twelve Fables of La Fontaine made owre intil Scots (Blair Atholl 2007))
 Lyrics and Tales in Twa Tongues (2008) (supported by a Scottish Arts Council Writer's Bursary)

Contributions include to Scots Language and Literature (Chapman, Edinburgh 1979) and to The Edinburgh Book of Twentieth-century Scottish Poetry.

Awards 
Winner in 1979 of the Society of Authors Eric Gregory Trust Award, Walter Perrie has been awarded Scottish Arts Council Bursaries in 1976, 1983, 1994 and 1999; the Book Awards, 1976 and 1983; the Ingram Merrill Foundation Award in 1987 and the Society of Authors Traveling Scholarship in 2000.

References

External links 
 Society of Authors, London

1949 births
People educated at Hamilton Academy
Alumni of the University of Edinburgh
Alumni of the University of Stirling
Scottish poets
Scottish writers
Living people